The red-toothed shrews of the subfamily Soricinae are one of three living subfamilies of shrews, along with Crocidurinae (white-toothed shrews) and Myosoricinae (African white-toothed shrews). In addition, the family contains the extinct subfamilies Limnoecinae, Crocidosoricinae, Allosoricinae and Heterosoricinae. These species are typically found in North America, northern South America, Europe and northern Asia. The enamel of the tips of their teeth is reddish due to iron pigment. The iron deposits serve to harden the enamel and are concentrated in those parts of the teeth most subject to wear.

The list of species is:

 Tribe Anourosoricini
 Genus Anourosorex (Asian mole shrews)
 Assam mole shrew, A. assamensis
 Giant mole shrew, A. schmidi
 Chinese mole shrew, A. squamipes
 Taiwanese mole shrew, A. yamashinai
 Tribe Blarinellini
 Genus Blarinella (Asiatic short-tailed shrews)
 Indochinese short-tailed shrew, B. griselda
 Asiatic short-tailed shrew, B. quadraticauda
 Burmese short-tailed shrew, B. wardi
 Tribe Blarinini
 Genus Blarina (American short-tailed shrews)
 Northern short-tailed shrew, B. brevicauda
 Southern short-tailed shrew, B. carolinensis
 Elliot's short-tailed shrew, B. hylophaga
 Everglades short-tailed shrew, B. peninsulae
 Genus Cryptotis (small-eared shrews)
 Cryptotis mexicana group
 Mexican small-eared shrew, C. mexicana
 Nelson's small-eared shrew, C. nelsoni
 Grizzled Mexican small-eared shrew, C. obscura
 Phillips's small-eared shrew, C. phillipsii
 Cryptotis goldmani set
 Central Mexican broad-clawed shrew, C. alticola
 Goldman's broad-clawed shrew, C. goldmani
 Goodwin's broad-clawed shrew, C. goodwini
 Guatemalan broad-clawed shrew, C. griseoventris
 C. lacertosus
 C. mam
 Oaxacan broad-clawed shrew, C. peregrina
 Cryptotis nigrescens group
 Eastern Cordillera small-footed shrew, C. brachyonyx
 Colombian small-eared shrew, C. colombiana
 Honduran small-eared shrew, C. hondurensis
 Yucatan small-eared shrew, C. mayensis
 Darién small-eared shrew, C. mera
 Merriam's small-eared shrew, C. merriami
 Blackish small-eared shrew, C. nigrescens
 Cryptotis thomasi group
 Ecuadoran small-eared shrew, C. equatoris
 Medellín small-eared shrew, C. medellinia
 Merida small-eared shrew, C. meridensis
 Wandering small-eared shrew, C. montivaga
 Peruvian small-eared shrew, C. peruviensis
 Scaly-footed small-eared shrew or Western Colombian small-eared shrew, C. squamipes
 Tamá small-eared shrew, C. tamensis
 Thomas's small-eared shrew, C. thomasi
 Cryptotis parva group
 Central American least shrew, C. orophila
 North American least shrew, C. parva
 Tropical small-eared shrew, C. tropicalis
 ungrouped/relict
 Enders's small-eared shrew, C. endersi
 Talamancan small-eared shrew, C. gracilis
 Big Mexican small-eared shrew, C. magna

 Tribe Nectogalini
 Genus Chimarrogale (Asiatic water shrews)
 Malayan water shrew, C. hantu
 Himalayan water shrew, C. himalayica
 Bornean water shrew, C. phaeura
 Japanese water shrew, C. platycephalus
 Chinese water shrew, C. styani
 Sumatran water shrew, C. sumatrana
 Genus Chodsigoa
 Van Sung's shrew, C. cauvansunga
Chodsigoa furva (Anthony, 1941) 
Chodsigoa hoffmanni Zhong-Zheng Chen et al., 2017
 De Winton's shrew, C. hypsibia
 Lamulate shrew, C. lamula (Soriculus lamula)
 Lowe's shrew, C. parca
 Pygmy brown-toothed shrew, C. parva
 Salenski's shrew, C. salenskii
 Smith's shrew, C. smithii
 Lesser Taiwanese shrew, C. sodalis
 Genus Episoriculus
 Hodgsons's brown-toothed shrew, E. caudatus
 Taiwanese brown-toothed shrew, E. fumidus
 Long-tailed brown-toothed shrew, E. leucops
 Long-tailed mountain shrew, E. macrurus
 Genus Nectogale
 Elegant water shrew, N. elegans
 Genus Neomys (Eurasian water shrews)
 Mediterranean water shrew, N. anomalus
 Eurasian water shrew, N. fodiens
 Transcaucasian water shrew, N. teres
 Genus †Nesiotites
 Balearic shrew, †N. hidalgo
 Sardinian shrew, †N. similis
 Corsican giant shrew,†N. corsicanus
 Genus Soriculus
 Himalayan shrew, S. nigrescens
 Tribe Notiosoricini
 Genus Megasorex
 Mexican shrew, M. gigas
 Genus Notiosorex
 Cockrum's gray shrew, N. cockrumi
 Crawford's gray shrew, N. crawfordi
 Large-eared gray shrew, N. evotis
 Villa's gray shrew, N. villai
 N. repenningi
 N. jacksoni
 N. harrisi
 N. dalquesti
 Tribe Soricini
 Genus Sorex (long-tailed shrews)
 Subgenus Otisorex
 Long-tailed shrew, Sorex dispar
 Smoky shrew, Sorex fumeus
 American pygmy shrew, Sorex hoyi
 Large-toothed shrew, Sorex macrodon
 Carmen Mountain shrew, Sorex milleri
 Dwarf shrew, Sorex nanus
 Mexican long-tailed shrew, Sorex oreopolus
 Orizaba long-tailed shrew, Sorex orizabae
 Ornate shrew, Sorex ornatus
 Inyo shrew, Sorex tenellus
 Verapaz shrew, Sorex veraepacis
 Sorex ixtlanensis (Carraway, 2007)
 Sorex vagrans complex
 Glacier Bay water shrew, Sorex alaskanus
 Baird's shrew, Sorex bairdii
 Marsh shrew, Sorex bendirii
 Montane shrew, Sorex monticolus
 New Mexico shrew, Sorex neomexicanus
 Pacific shrew, Sorex pacificus
 American water shrew, Sorex palustris
 Fog shrew, Sorex sonomae
 Vagrant shrew, Sorex vagrans
 Sorex cinereus group
 Kamchatka shrew, Sorex camtschatica
 Cinereus shrew, Sorex cinereus
 Prairie shrew, Sorex haydeni
 Saint Lawrence Island shrew, Sorex jacksoni
 Paramushir shrew, Sorex leucogaster
 Southeastern shrew, Sorex longirostris
 Mount Lyell shrew, Sorex lyelli
 Portenko's shrew, Sorex portenkoi
 Preble's shrew, Sorex preblei
 Pribilof Island shrew, Sorex pribilofensis
 Olympic shrew, Sorex rohweri
 Barren ground shrew, Sorex ugyunak
 Subgenus Sorex
 Dneper common shrew, Sorex averini
 Lesser striped shrew, Sorex bedfordiae
 Stripe-backed shrew, Sorex cylindricauda
 Chinese highland shrew, Sorex excelsus
 Azumi shrew, Sorex hosonoi
 Chinese shrew, Sorex sinalis
 Alaska tiny shrew, Sorex yukonicus
 Sorex alpinus group
 Alpine shrew, Sorex alpinus
 Ussuri shrew, Sorex mirabilis
 Sorex araneus group
 Valais shrew, Sorex antinorii
 Common shrew, Sorex araneus
 Udine shrew, Sorex arunchi
 Millet's shrew, Sorex coronatus
 Siberian large-toothed shrew, Sorex daphaenodon
 Iberian shrew, Sorex granarius
 Caucasian shrew, Sorex satunini
 Sorex arcticus group
 Arctic shrew, Sorex arcticus
 Maritime shrew, Sorex maritimensis
 Sorex tundrensis group
 Tien Shan shrew, Sorex asper
 Gansu shrew, Sorex cansulus
 Tundra shrew, Sorex tundrensis
 Sorex minutus group
 Buchara shrew, Sorex buchariensis
 Kozlov's shrew, Sorex kozlovi
 Caucasian pygmy shrew, Sorex volnuchini
 Sorex caecutiens group
 Laxmann's shrew, Sorex caecutiens
 Taiga shrew, Sorex isodon
 Eurasian least shrew, Sorex minutissimus
 Eurasian pygmy shrew, Sorex minutus
 Flat-skulled shrew, Sorex roboratus
 Shinto shrew, Sorex shinto
 Long-clawed shrew, Sorex unguiculatus
 Sorex gracillimus group
 Slender shrew, Sorex gracillimus
 Sorex raddei group
 Radde's shrew, Sorex raddei
 Sorex samniticus group
 Apennine shrew, Sorex samniticus
 Subgenus incertae sedis
 Arizona shrew, Sorex arizonae
 Zacatecas shrew, Sorex emarginatus
 Merriam's shrew, Sorex merriami
 Kashmir pygmy shrew, Sorex planiceps
 Saussure's shrew, Sorex saussurei
 Sorex mediopua (Carraway, 2007)
 Sclater's shrew, Sorex sclateri
 San Cristobal shrew, Sorex stizodon
 Tibetan shrew, Sorex thibetanus
 Trowbridge's shrew, Sorex trowbridgii
 Chestnut-bellied shrew, Sorex ventralis
 Veracruz shrew, Sorex veraecrucis

References